Frederick Frith (1819-1871) was an English painter and photographer. He began his career in England but later moved to Australia where he lived in Hobart and Melbourne.

Early career and partnership 

Frederick Frith was born in the United Kingdom. He was from an English family consisting of painters and silhouettists. He was the son of John Frith and Letitia née Gardiner, his brother was Henry Frith and he was married to Emma Golding. Before moving to Melbourne in 1855, it is known that he studied and practiced painting in London, Brighton, Ireland and Scotland. In 1853 he was asked to showcase his artworks including Death of a Stag. In 1855 he moved and began work as a painter in Melbourne, Australia, then moved to Hobart later that year. He exhibited his artwork in Melbourne in 1854 which consisted mainly of his watercolour and oil paintings. In 1855 while he was exhibiting his artwork, he met John Mathieson Sharp. They later became partners and worked in their own studio which Sharp had just bought. They named the studio the Chromatype Gallery. "Chroma" is the Greek word for colour, and referred to his method of overpainting salted paper prints with oil, watercolour and/or pastel. Only a few dozen of their Chromatype artworks remain, the fact they stayed intact after all these years was seen as a demonstration of their vitality in paper photography. This process was similar to works often referred to as a Photo-crayotype. Later in 1855, the daily news published Frith and Sharp's five part panorama of Hobart. This panorama was seen as the first proper panorama and what started the trades of albums and prints that they sold to the community.

Civil law suit 

In 1855 Frith brought a civil suit against a Hobart Town merchant, Samuel Moses. Frith painted him and his family but Samuel refused to pay him due to the fact they were overpriced and lacked effort and passion that he believed Frith should have shown. Although true that his paintings weren't at their best, Conway Hart and Alfred Bock brought forth that Frith's paintings were defective in colour and composition which was considered not of the standard of a trained artist. In the end Frith won the case and won compensation along with the cost for damages.

One partnership ends, another begins 

After ten years Frith and Sharps partnership came to an end in 1856. They separated and furthered their work in their own studios. Sharp continued making chromatypes and stereographs in Hobart and Frith worked on making large format views. A year later after Frith and Sharp's separation, Henry Frith (brother) joined his business and was put in charge of the travelling for the studio. After Frith began his own studio, he did less work on paintings and focused more on photography. Later in 1858, Frith presented two panoramas both taken in Hobart. The two photos were taken at the Domain and St Paul's Church. In 1858 the Frith brothers opened a second studio located at Launceston to further his career and produce more artworks. Although his artworks were very popular, they were quite over priced which led to more court cases. He once again showcased his Death of a Stag piece in the Hobart Town Art Treasures Exhibition which earned him more profit and proved it was one of his most famous pieces.

Double portrait 

One of Frith's most well-known artworks was a double portrait which showcased his photographic skills which appeared to be ahead of their time in regards to the lack of technology available in that era (as seen in the image on the right). To accomplish this he could have used either opaque screen between two exposures or a masking plate holder. The way he pulled this technique off was by removing the lens cap of his camera to create a make-believe photograph. Frith's camera didn't have a shutter because the wet plate process that was used at the time required an exposure of several seconds.

Death 

Frederick Frith will be remembered for his unique style of achieving shots that seemed very difficult to most other photographers. Although his life was short lived, he certainly left behind an amazing series of images that will be remembered for many years to come. Throughout his career Frith seemed more interested in painting, especially when he was working with his former partner John Sharp - Sharp was known as the photographer, Frith the painter. By using photography and painting, many of his portrait photographs looked like watercolour paintings. Frederick Frith died in 1871.

References

Australian photographers
People from Hobart
19th-century Australian artists
1819 births
1871 deaths
19th-century English painters
English male painters
English emigrants to Australia
19th-century English male artists